Dangerous Waters, also known as S.C.S. Dangerous Waters, is a 2005 naval warfare simulation game developed by American studio Sonalysts Combat Simulations. It was released for Microsoft Windows in 2005, and on Steam on February 7, 2006.

Gameplay
Dangerous Waters is a naval warfare simulation game which features many player-controllable units deployed in the armed forces of 18 different countries. Campaign mode allows a player to control forces as the United States Navy, Russian Federation Navy, or People's Liberation Army Navy of China. Players can perform multiple station roles such as radar and sonar, required to complete missions manually, or have those stations played in AI mode with simulated crew members manning non-command functions.

The multi-player mode allows multiple players to occupy individual crew stations on the same vessel, i.e. to control the same vessel together.

Some controllable assets are available in different versions.

Dangerous Waters allows the player to create scenarios using an included mission editor which includes a scripting language. Dangerous Waters can use and import scenario scripts from these other games: 688(I) Hunter/Killer, Sub Command, and Fleet Command.

In 2009, a community-made mod titled Reinforce Alert was released, which added new playable naval, surface, and air units to the game.

Release
The game was initially not sold in stores, and was only available through the website www.battlefront.com. In December 2005, Dangerous Waters was made available at retail stores by publisher Strategy First. In early January 2006, Valve announced it would be selling Dangerous Waters via its Steam content delivery system. The preload began January 24, 2006, and was released a few weeks later, February 7.

Dangerous Waters was published in Europe by BlackBean Games and was in UK stores on May 26, 2006. It included exclusive European content on a second DVD (also available on the company's website. A 90-page printed manual was included in the box (consisting of the first four sections of the 570 page manual, plus appendices), with the full manual as a PDF file.

Reception

The game received "favorable" reviews according to video game review aggregator Metacritic.

References

External links

2005 video games
Cold War video games
Cooperative video games
Multiplayer vehicle operation games
Naval video games
Ship simulation games
Strategy First games
Submarine simulation video games
Vehicle simulation MOGs
Video games developed in the United States
Windows games
Windows-only games
Black Bean Games games
Multiplayer and single-player video games